The President's Commission on Law Enforcement and Administration of Justice was a group of 19 people appointed by President Johnson in 1967 to study the American criminal justice system.  Johnson assigned the group the task of fighting crime and repairing the American criminal justice system:

The Commission's final report was issued in 1967 has been described as "the most comprehensive evaluation of crime and crime control in the United States at the time".  It laid out reorganization plans for police departments and suggested a range of reforms.  Several of the Commission's findings related to the poor treatment of juvenile offenders.

References

History of law enforcement in the United States
Politics of the United States by issue
Law Enforcement and Administration of Justice, President's Commission on
Presidency of Lyndon B. Johnson